Brigadier-General Herbert Henry Austin  (1 June 1868 – 27 April 1937) was a British Army officer, colonial engineering surveyor and author.

Military career
Austin was the second son of Colonel Edmund Austin of the British Indian Army. He was educated at Clifton College and the Royal Military Academy, Woolwich before commissioning into the Royal Engineers in 1887. He was promoted to Lieutenant in 1890. In 1891 he was one of four officers of the Royal Engineers appointed to survey the route of the Uganda Railway under Sir James Macdonald, who he had met while serving on the North-West Frontier. While in Africa he was made a Commander of the Order of the Brilliant Star of Zanzibar and led an expedition to the Omo River. He subsequently served in the Waziristan Expedition of 1894–1895, in operations in Uganda between 1897 and 1898 (for which he was awarded the Distinguished Service Order), and in the Persian Gulf from 1909 to 1910. Austin was made a Companion of the Order of St Michael and St George in the 1901 Birthday Honours for survey expeditions into Abyssinia.

He was appointed a General Staff Officer in HQ India in 1914 and was Commandant of Cadet College Quetta the following year. In 1915 Austin was made a Brigadier-General and served on the General Staff during the First World War. He was awarded the Order of the White Eagle (Serbia) (3rd class, with swords) in 1916.

Publications
Among Swamps and Giants in Equatorial Africa (1902)
With MacDonald in Uganda (1903)
Some Rambles of a Sapper (1928)

References

1868 births
1937 deaths
British Army generals of World War I
Companions of the Distinguished Service Order
Companions of the Order of St Michael and St George
Companions of the Order of the Bath
Graduates of the Royal Military Academy, Woolwich
People educated at Clifton College
Royal Engineers officers
Uganda Protectorate people